Josina Anna Petronella van Aerssen, married name Baroness Giustina Boetzelaer (3 January 1733 – 3 September 1797) was a Dutch composer, painter, lady in waiting and noble.

Life
She was born in The Hague to Cornelis van Aerssen and Anna Albertina van Schagen Beijeren and in 1786 married Baron Carel van Boetzelaer.

Josina van Aerssen was the lady in waiting to Anne, Princess Royal and Princess of Orange, the spouse of prince William IV of Orange. She was a dilettante painter and made a portrait of princess Caroline. She was possibly active as a dilettante composer at court.

In 1780, she published several compositions. They were inspired by the Italian music and considered unique for the Netherlands.  She died, aged 64, in IJsselstein.

References

1733 births
1797 deaths
18th-century classical composers
18th-century Dutch writers
Dutch women classical composers
Dutch classical composers
Dutch ladies-in-waiting
Musicians from The Hague
18th-century Dutch painters
18th-century Dutch artists
18th-century women composers